Amanat Ali may refer to the following people:

 Amanat Ali Khan (1922–1974), Pakistani classical vocalist and ghazal singer, from the Patiala gharana
 Asad Amanat Ali Khan (1955–2007), Pakistani classical, semi-classical and ghazal singer, from the Patiala gharana
 Shafqat Amanat Ali (born 1965), Pakistani classical vocalist and playback singer, from the Patiala gharana
Amanat Ali (singer) (born 1987), Pakistani singer